The National Party of Australia – Queensland (NPA-Q), commonly known as Queensland Nationals, or the National Party of Queensland, was the Queensland-state branch of the National Party of Australia (NPA) until 2008. Prior to 1974, it was known as the Country Party.

Formed in 1915 by the Queensland Farmers' Union (QFU) and serving as the state branch of the National Party of Australia, it initially sought to represent the interests of the farmers but over time became a more general conservative political party in the state, leading to much debate about relations with other conservative parties and a string of mergers that were soon undone. From 1924 onward, it was the senior partner in the centre-right coalition with the state Liberal Party and its predecessors, in a reversal of the normal situation at the federal level and in the rest of Australia. The Country-Liberal Coalition won power in 1957 and governed until the Liberals broke away in 1983; the Nationals continued to govern in their own right until defeat in 1989. The party formed another Coalition with the Liberals that took power in 1996 but was defeated in 1998. After a further decade in opposition, in 2008, the two parties merged to form the Liberal National Party of Queensland.

History
Throughout their history the Nationals were repeatedly beset by the question of whether or not to merge with other conservative political forces in the state to provide a unified political alternative to the Labor Party or whether it was more important to maintain a distinct voice for the countryside. A third approach, practiced most prominently in the 1970s and 1980s, was to seek to expand the party's appeal to urban Queensland and ultimately make the party the dominant force on the right.

Origins
Prior to the First World War a series of efforts were made to give political representation to rural interests but these were slow and limited in scope, with most effort focused on existing parties. Then in the 1915 election dissatisfaction with the Liberal government of Digby Denham led to the Queensland Farmers' Union running its own candidates, five of whom were elected. John Appel, a former minister who had broken with Denham, became the leader of what was now a distinct separate Country Party grouping in the Legislative Assembly of Queensland. The party drew its main strength from farmers in the east of the state and had limited success with graziers in the west. Although the United Cane Growers' Association and then the United Graziers' Association would join with the QFU by 1919 to form the Primary Producers' Union, the party's electoral base would be geographically constrained for the next four decades.

Independence was initially short-lived. Labor had won power at the 1915 election and the opposition forces soon looked to ally. The National Political Council was formed and the Liberals and Country Party came together as the National Party to fight the 1918 election; however the union was short-lived and in July 1920 the Nationalists split with the majority of MLAs reforming a separate Country Party led by William Vowles. A third party, the Northern Country Party emerged as a regional split with the Nationalists. The three parties co-operated in the 1920 state election but were unable to dislodge Labor. The same year saw the formation of the federal Country Party. In 1921 James Hunter won the Division of Maranoa in a by-election, giving the Country Party their first federal member in Queensland.

Over the next few years the Country Party absorbed the Northern Country Party, though its elected members joined with the rump of the National Party who now organised in the state as the Queensland United Party. The United Party won more seats than the Country Party at the 1923 state election, but in subsequent elections fought as separate parties the Country/National Party would consistently win more seats than the other major conservative party.

Repeated fusion
Arthur Edward Moore became the new leader of the Country Party in September 1923 and then the following April was elected leader of a joint opposition as the Country and United parties sought greater unity. In May 1925 the two parties' organisations merged as the Country Progressive Party but four United MLAs initially sought to revive as the Nationalist Party until December that year when they too joined in what was now named the Country and Progressive National Party. Moore would retain the leadership throughout the existence of the CPNP. The CPNP won power at the 1929 state election but the Moore Ministry would only last one term amidst the challenges of the Great Depression, being defeated in 1932. Following a second defeat in 1935, the CPNP split into separate Country Party and United Australia Party branches.

Ted Maher led the party to further defeats in 1938 and 1941. Then in April of the latter year, newly elected federal Country Party leader Arthur Fadden, MP for the Queensland Division of Darling Downs, sought to merge the Country and United Australia parties. Only in Queensland did this yield much success with the two parliamentary parties forming the Country-National Organisation. Frank Nicklin of the Country side became the new leader of the party. However the merger was resisted both by some Country Party MLAs and by the extra-parliamentary organisation, with the western division of the Queensland Country Party continuing to operate as a separate body. Former federal MP James Hunter worked hard for demerger, an aim achieved by 1944. A new party constitution allowed co-operation but forbade merger with other parties. Nicklin continued as the leader of the separate Country Party which co-operated with the Queensland People's Party, formed by John Beals Chandler out of the UAP remnants, which would later be renamed the Liberal Party of Australia (Queensland Division) in 1949.

A pattern was set in the 1944 state election whereby the Country Party secured fewer votes but more seats than the People's Party; this pattern would continue into the 1970s. Nicklin would continue to lead the party to defeat over five successive elections, but there seemed little prospect of defeating Labor, especially after the introduction of a malapportionment that significantly varied the size of electorates in different zones of the state.

Into government
In 1957 the Labor Party in Queensland was engulfed in the split that had been growing in the party across Australia over the influence of communism. The sitting Premier Vince Gair was expelled from the party and led a breakaway Queensland Labor Party that sought to retain office. Gair sought to retain office helming a minority government, and sought backing from the Country Party. Nicklin initially considered offering support to Gair, but then declined when Fadden–by then, de facto federal Deputy Prime Minister–argued there was the opportunity for the Country Party to win power in its own right. When the state parliament resumed sitting, the rump Labor caucus moved to block supply. Nicklin instructed the Coalition to vote against the government as well, bringing it down. At the 1957 state election, the Country-Liberal Coalition won power after a quarter of a century. Due to a large number of three-cornered contests (every QLP incumbent faced a Labor challenger, and vice versa), the Coalition won a solid majority, winning 42 seats against only 31 for the two Labor factions combined.

Nicklin had a strong working relationship with Liberal leader Kenneth Morris which would underpin the Coalition's initial years in government, although Nicklin privately found Morris trying at times. In government the two parties sought to tweak the electoral system to their advantage, with the Country Party securing the continuation of the zonal system that would keep them as the larger party despite some Liberal opposition. Later in 1962 the Liberals secured the reintroduction of preferential voting which would allow the non-Labor vote to combine but also in the long term allowed for the two Coalition parties to contest seats against one another, while preferencing each other ahead of Labor. The Nicklin Ministry governed over what has been described as "the most tranquil decade of [Queensland's] recent political history", but within the parties tensions were growing over the balance of the Coalition. Brisbane's growth was rapidly spilling onto the Redcliffe Peninsula, and the Gold Coast was also seeing growing urbanisation. Additionally, the Liberals were setting up new branches in traditional Country Party areas. This put pressure on the traditional allocation of seats between the two partners. The 1966 state election saw the Country and Liberal parties stand against each other in eight seats, but none changed between the Coalition partners. In general Nicklin took a relaxed approach to Coalition arrangements that sought to avoid direct confrontation, and this kept the parties together without destructive internal confrontation. Suffering ill health, Nicklin retired in early 1968. He was succeeded by Jack Pizzey, who had served as deputy leader of the party since 1957. However barely half a year later Pizzey died of a heart attack.

The Joh Bjelke-Petersen years
Joh Bjelke-Petersen, the sitting deputy leader, was elected leader of the party. Over the next two decades he would dominate the party, government and state, as well as making multiple interventions into federal politics. In contrast to the Nicklin years, Bjelke-Petersen would also preside over a deterioration in relations between the two coalition parties. The first conflict came immediately. Liberal leader Gordon Chalk had been appointed as interim Premier immediately upon Pizzey's death, pending the Country Party choosing a new leader. However, Chalk argued to retain the post, even though the Liberals had seven fewer seats than the Country Party. Bjelke-Petersen threatened to break up the Coalition unless Chalk backed down, and prevailed.

As Premier, Bjelke-Petersen oversaw rapid economic growth and development in the state, including greater urbanisation. His government pursued uncompromising conservatism, taking an especially heavy-handed line against trade unions and demonstrators, leading to accusations that Queensland had become a banana republic. He especially advocated the notion of Queensland exceptionalism, yielding ever greater electoral success. The Country Party continued to benefit from the electoral malapportionment which continued to be modified throughout their time in government. Nicknamed the "Bjelkemander", it continued to strengthen the Coalition against Labor, reinforcing the conservatives' hold on power. At the same time, it also strengthened the Country Party against the Liberals. However the changing nature of Queensland meant that the rural population was in decline whilet provincial cities were growing, placing the Country Party's position under greater threat. An early conflict came in a by-election for the Gold Coast seat of Albert. The seat had been in Country Party hands since 1936, but over the 1960s saw increased electoral pressure from first independents and then the Liberals. The by-election saw the Country Party vote collapse and the Liberals take the seat. Together with accusations surrounding his financial affairs this placed Bjelke-Petersen under immense pressure and he only narrowly survived a leadership challenge.

Although the 1969 and 1972 state elections saw little change, the next few years would be transformative for the party and its fortunes. The 1972 federal election saw Labor win power nationally for the first time in 23 years under Gough Whitlam. Bjelke-Petersen soon set himself up as one of the most prominent and implacable foes of the Whitlam Government, leading to the Prime Minister calling the Premier "a Bible-bashing bastard... a paranoic, a bigot and fanatical." The Country Party sought greater unity with other opposition groups. It even explored a merger with the state Democratic Labor Party (formerly the QLP), for which the Country Party modified its constitution to allow the possibility. In April 1974 as part of the attempt to expand its appeal into urban areas the party changed its name to the National Party, eight years before the federal party adopted that name. Later that year Bjelke-Petersen called an early election, attacking the federal Labor government. The result saw Labor routed, with their leader Perc Tucker losing his own seat. The party also won its first seat in Brisbane as Bill Lamond gained the electoral district of Wynnum. Subsequently, at the 1977 state election the Nationals outpolled the Liberals for the first time, a position they would maintain for the next twenty years. The party responded to its strengthened position by consolidating its position in the cabinet at the expense of its partner. In parliament the Nationals pushed a number of policies and tactics, overcoming opposition from the Liberal leadership on matters ranging from the abolition of death duties to breaking the convention on mid-term federal Senate replacements by filling a Labor vacancy with Albert Field, a nominal Labor member hostile to Whitlam, which contributed to the latter's dismissal. Bjelke-Petersen did not just hamper Labor federal governments though, with a breakdown in relations with the Liberals leading to the two parties running competing Senate tickets at the 1980 federal election, costing the Coalition a seat and thus its majority.

The Nationals continued to dominate over the Liberals, who suffered increasing division over tactics between the parliamentary leadership, the backbenchers and the extra-parliamentary party. Chalk had retired in 1976, succeeded by William Knox who lasted just over two years before being replaced by Llewellyn Edwards. However, despite demands for a stronger Liberal approach, the leadership felt unable to deliver it. At the 1980 state election the Nationals gained further seats at the expense of the Liberals, with tensions building further. A growing group of Liberal critics dubbed the "Ginger Group" increasingly challenged both their own leadership and the Nationals. In 1982 Angus Innes challenged Edwards for the leadership, despite Bjelke-Petersen declaring he would prefer a minority government to a coalition with an Innes-led Liberal Party, and only narrowly lost by 12:10. Matters boiled over the following year when Terry White, the Liberal Minister for Welfare Services, voted against the government line in a debate on creating a public accounts committee to monitor public spending. This was in line with Liberal policy but against the government position, although White disputed the latter point. White was sacked from the government and successfully challenged Edwards for the leadership, with Innes elected as deputy. Bjelke-Petersen refused to appoint White as Deputy Premier and the Coalition was dissolved. The Nationals governed as a minority for a few months until the 1983 state election at which they won 41 out of the 82 seats available, including several in Brisbane, while the Liberals were reduced to a mere eight. This left the Nationals one seat short of an outright majority. Soon two Liberals, Brian Austin and Don Lane, switched to the Nationals, allowing Bjelke-Petersen to govern in his own right.

Following further modification to the "Bjelkemander", the party went on to win an outright majority at the 1986 state election; it was to be the party's best ever election result and the only time in the whole of Australia that the Nationals have won majority government in their own right. Federally another Labor government had been elected in 1983 and Bjelke-Petersen turned his fire not only on Prime Minister Bob Hawke and the programme of the Hawke Government but also on the federal opposition led by John Howard and Ian Sinclair. A "Joh for PM", later "Joh for Canberra", campaign began in 1987, but it ultimately fizzled out with Bjelke-Petersen not standing in the 1987 federal election. Nevertheless, the campaign succeeded in temporarily breaking up the federal Coalition. Due to the ensuing number of three-cornered contests, Labor won a third term, while the Nationals lost seats in Queensland. Amidst all this, accusations of corruption in the Queensland Police led to an inquiry being commissioned in Bjelke-Petersen's absence. The Fitzgerald Inquiry led to significant political damage within the party, undermining Bjelke-Petersen's authority, The party began to turn on him, with ministers going as far to openly oppose him at cabinet meetings. Eventually in November 1987 the Nationals deposed Bjelke-Petersen in a party-room coup, replacing him with Mike Ahern.

Collapse and slow recovery
Ahern served as Premier for nearly two years, during which time the party continued to be riven by infighting between supporters and opponents of Bjelke-Petersen and by continued revelations from the Fitzgerald Inquiry. He tried to implement a more consultative approach to governing, but this was not enough to stop the party's standing in the polls from tailing off. The Nationals entered 1989 facing a statutory general election later that year, and with polls suggesting that they would be roundly defeated.

In hopes of buying more time, Russell Cooper, a National Party traditionalist, successfully challenged Ahern for the leadership. However, Cooper was unable to stem the growing anger at the revelations about the massive corruption in the Bjelke-Petersen government. Cooper waited as long as he could, finally calling an election for 2 December. At that election, the Nationals were thrown from office on a massive 24-seat swing, ending 32 years in power.

The new Labor government of Wayne Goss dismantled the "Bjelkemander"; the ensuing "one vote one value" reforms resulted in Brisbane electing nearly half of the legislature. Furthermore, the voting system was changed from full preferencing to optional preferencing, making it harder for the Nationals and Liberals to contest the same seats without risking loss to Labor. As a result, the Nationals faced a much tougher route back into government and the next two decades would see renewed strong debate over relations with the Liberals, with the latter party initially instead seeking to achieve senior status and steadily replacing the Nationals as the main conservative party on the Sunshine Coast and then the Gold Coast. Cooper stood down as leader in 1991 to be succeeded by Rob Borbidge, but despite the major changes to the electoral distribution the outcome of the 1992 election was much the same as 1989. By late 1992, the two parties had reformed the Coalition and presented a united front in the 1995 state election. The initial results saw Labor retain power with a one-seat majority, but this was overturned when the result in one seat was declared void and the Liberals won the subsequent by-election. With the support of independent Liz Cunningham, Borbidge became premier.

During Borbidge's premiership the party faced a strong challenge from the rise of Pauline Hanson's One Nation party that challenged on issues such as multiculturalism, gun ownership and native title which were well received in the Nationals' heartland of rural and regional Queensland. The Nationals faced a sharp backlash against the introduction of gun control laws after the Port Arthur massacre. At the 1998 election the Coalition lost much support to One Nation. The election also saw the Nationals poll fewer votes than the Liberals for the first time in over a quarter of a century despite winning more seats, an outcome that would recur for the next decade. Borbidge held out hope of staying in office after leakage of Coalition preferences delivered seven seats to One Nation that would have otherwise gone to Labor, leaving Labor one seat short of a majority. However, this depended on the support of both independents in the chamber, Cunningham and newly elected Peter Wellington. After some consideration, Wellington threw his support to Labor, ending what proved to be the last National-led government in Queensland.

Borbidge continued to lead the Nationals, but was unable to get the better of Beattie even after One Nation imploded and an inquiry ended the careers of several Labor MPs. The Coalition went into the 2001 state election in a state of near-paralysis. At that election, the Coalition suffered a small two-percent swing against it. However, its support in Brisbane all but melted, and it fell to only one seat in the capital. Borbidge retired from politics soon afterward.

Merger with the Liberals

The next seven years saw a string of leaders - Mike Horan, Lawrence Springborg (twice) and Jeff Seeney - come and go with little further advancement in the 2004 state election. In 2005 Lawrence Springborg and Liberal leader Bob Quinn publicly explored merging their parties to present a fully united alternative to Labor, but by 2006 the plan was declared dead and buried. The parties again lost the 2006 state election. Following federal defeat in the 2007 election and Springborg's return to the leadership the proposal was revived, and in July 2008 the parties agreed to merge as the Liberal National Party, with Springborg as the merged party's first leader. Although the new party was dominated by former Nationals, an agreement with its federal counterparts gave it full voting rights with the Liberals and observer status with the Nationals.

The merged party has so far lasted a decade, but from time to time calls are made for the parties to demerge from both Liberals and Nationals.

Leaders

Election results

Notes

References

See also
:Category:National Party of Australia members of the Parliament of Queensland

Bibliography
 
 
 

Queensland
Political parties established in 1915
1915 establishments in Australia
Defunct political parties in Queensland
Defunct agrarian political parties
Political parties disestablished in 2008
2008 disestablishments in Australia
Agrarian parties in Australia